Buea is the capital of the Southwest Region of Cameroon. The city is located in Fako Division, on the eastern slopes of Mount Cameroon, and has a population of 300,000 (at the 2013 Census). It has two Government Hotels, the Mountain Hotel and Parliamentarian Flats Hotel located around The Government Residential Area.

History

Buea, originally "bue", was founded by a hunter who came from the Bomboko area. Coming from the Bomboko side of the mountain, he named the new-found land in amazement as "a Bue", meaning literally a "son of bué". A prominent King of the tikar clashes with German troops during invasion.
Resistance remain popular folklore; currently ruled by the Endeleys. Tea growing is an important local industry, especially in Tole. Buea was the colonial capital of German Kamerun from 1901 to 1919, the capital of the Southern Cameroons from 1949 until 1961 and the capital of West Cameroon until 1972, when Ahmadou Ahidjo abolished the Federation of Cameroon. The German colonial administration in Buea was temporarily suspended during the eruption of Mount Cameroon from 28 April until June 1909. Originally, Buea's population consisted mainly of the Bakweri people. However, owing to its status as a university town and the regional capital, there are significant numbers of other ethnic groups.

Ambazonian secession
In September 2017, the Federal Republic of Ambazonia declared its independence from Cameroon, with Buea as its claimed capital. In late-June 2018, the Ambazonia Defence Forces began approaching Buea, and on 29 June they invaded the Mile 16 neighborhood. On 1 July, separatists invaded the Muea neighborhood and battled Cameroonian troops.

Notable institutions
Buea hosts the University of Buea, Cameroon's first anglophone university. It is the site of several other higher institutes of learning, including St Francis Schools of Nursing and Midwifery presently known as Biaka University Institute of Buea (BUIB) and one of Cameroon's three Catholic universities.

A handful of colonial era buildings are surviving, notably the palatial former residence of the German governor Jesko von Puttkamer. Other German colonial buildings are still standing, but some of them suffer from lack of maintenance and old age.

The Nigerian Consulate in anglophone Cameroon and the main operational hub of the Naigahelp medical aid organisation are in Buea.

Buea hosts an annex of the National Archives of Cameroon, whose main location is Yaoundé. Next door to the annex is the Cameroon Press Photo Archive, which has been permanently closed since 2001.

Geography
About 300,000 people live in Buea (including the villages of Bokwaongo, Muea; Bomaka; Tole; Mile 16 (Bolifamba); Mile 17; Mile 15; Mile 14 (Dibanda); Bova; Bonjongo; Likombe; Buasa; Great Soppo; Molyko; Small Soppo; Bwitingi; Mile 18 (Wonyamavio); Lower farms; Bokwai; Bonduma; Sandpit, Wonyamongo, Bulu; Bokova and surrounding villages).

Climate

Buea has a subtropical highland climate (Cfb) closely bordering on a tropical rainforest climate (Af). Because of its location at the foot of Mount Cameroon, the climate in Buea tends to be humid, with the neighbourhoods at higher elevations enjoying cooler temperatures while the lower neighbourhoods experience a hotter climate. Extended periods of rainfall, characterized by incessant drizzle, which can last for weeks, are common during the rainy season as are damp fogs, rolling off the mountain into the town below.

Transport 
Limbe was served by a  gauge plantation railway to Limbe, of the West African Planting Society Victoria.

Gallery

Notable people 
 Julius Akosah
 Daphne (born 1989), singer

See also 
 Roman Catholic Diocese of Buéa

References

External links

Mount Cameroon Inter-communal Ecotourism Board - formerly known as Mount Cameroon Ecotourism Organisation, abbreviated as Mount CEO

 
Communes of Cameroon
Mount Cameroon
Ambazonia
Former colonial capitals
Communes of Southwest Region (Cameroon)